Meghan King is an American reality television personality. She was a cast member on the Bravo series The Real Housewives of Orange County from 2015 to 2017.

Early life and education 
King was born in St. Louis, Missouri. She is the sister of model RJ King, professional soccer player Julie King, and model and former Amazing Race contestant Caitlin King. She holds a bachelor of business administration degree from the University of Mississippi, specializing in marketing.

Career 
Prior to moving to California, King worked as a sales representative for a pathology software firm.

She made her first appearance in reality television on the TV show Resale Royalty. She appeared again when her engagement to Jim Edmonds and search for a wedding gown were documented in season 12 of the TLC series, Say Yes to the Dress, which aired in 2014.

In 2015, Bravo announced that King would join the season-10 cast of The Real Housewives of Orange County, as a housewife. She reprised the role in season 11, which aired in summer 2016 and the twelfth season in 2017.

Personal life 

King married Brad McDill in July 2007. They divorced in November 2011.

King married former baseball player Jim Edmonds in October 2014. She was the stepmother of Jim's four children and lived half the year in St. Louis and half the year in Newport Beach. The couple had their first child via in vitro fertilization in November 2016. They separated in October 2019 after five years of marriage. They have three children. They finalized their divorce in May 2021.

One of her sons has periventricular leukomalacia and brain damage.

In October 2021, King married lawyer Cuffe Biden Owens, son of Valerie Biden Owens. They separated in December 2021. In March 2022, King stated that she planned to annul the marriage. The marriage was annulled by July 2022.

Filmography 

 Say Yes to the Dress, season 12 (2014)
 Resale Royalty season 1 (2013)
 The Real Housewives of Orange County, season 10 (2015), season 11 (2016), and season 12 (2017)
 Access Hollywood Live, "The Real Housewives of Orange County Plugged-In Panel" (June 17, 2016)

References

External links
 

Living people
The Real Housewives cast members
People from St. Louis County, Missouri
American women television personalities
1984 births
Biden family